Military production during World War II was the production or mobilization of arms, ammunition, personnel and financing by the belligerents of the war, from the occupation of Austria in early 1938 to the surrender and occupation of Japan in late 1945.

The mobilization of funds, people, natural resources and material for the production and supply of military equipment and military forces during World War II was a critical component of the war effort. During the conflict, the Allies outpaced the Axis powers in most production categories. Access to the funding and industrial resources necessary to sustain the war effort was linked to their respective economic and political alliances.

Historical context
During the 1930s, political forces in Germany increased their financial investment in the military to develop the armed forces required to support near and long-term political and territorial goals. Germany's economic, scientific, research, and industrial capabilities were one of the most technically advanced in the world at the time, supporting a rapidly growing, innovative military. However, access to (and control of) the resources and production capacity required to entertain long-term goals (such as European control, German territorial expansion and the destruction of the USSR) were limited. Political demands necessitated the expansion of Germany's control of natural and human resources, industrial capacity and farmland beyond its borders. Germany's military production was tied to resources outside its area of control, a great disadvantage as compared to the Allies.

In 1938 Britain was the world's superpower, with political and economic control of a quarter of the world's population, industry and resources, and closely allied with the independent Dominion nations (such as Canada and South Africa). From 1938 to mid-1942, the British coordinated the Allied effort in all global theatres. They fought the German, Italian, Japanese and Vichy armies, air forces and navies across Europe, Africa, Asia, the Middle East, India, the Mediterranean and in the Atlantic, Indian, Pacific and Arctic Oceans. British forces destroyed Italian armies in North and East Africa, and occupied or enlisted overseas colonies of occupied European nations. Following engagements with Axis forces, British Empire troops occupied Libya, Italian Somaliland, Eritrea, Ethiopia, Iran and Iraq. The Empire funded and delivered supplies by Arctic convoys to the USSR, and supported Free French forces to recapture French Equatorial Africa. Britain also established governments in exile in London to rally support in occupied Europe for the Allied effort. The British held back or slowed the Axis powers for three years while mobilising their globally integrated economy and industrial infrastructure to build what became, by 1942, the most extensive military apparatus of the war. This allowed their later allies (such as the United States) to mobilise their economies and develop the military forces required to play a role in the war effort, and for the British to go on the offensive in its theatres of operation.

The entry of the United States into the war in late 1941 injected financial, human and industrial resources into Allied operations. The US produced more than its own military forces required and armed itself and its allies for the most industrialized war in history. At the beginning of the war, the British and French placed large orders for aircraft with American manufacturers and the US Congress approved plans to increase its air forces by 3,000 planes. In May 1940, Franklin D. Roosevelt called for the production of 185,000 aeroplanes, 120,000 tanks, 55,000 anti-aircraft guns and 18 million tons of merchant shipping in two years. Adolf Hitler was told by his advisors that this was American propaganda; in 1939, annual aircraft production for the US military was less than 3,000 planes. By the end of the war US factories had produced 300,000 planes, and by 1944 had produced two-thirds of the Allied military equipment used in the war — bringing military forces into play in North and South America, the Caribbean, the Atlantic, Western Europe and the Pacific.

The U.S. produced vast quantities of military equipment into late 1945, including nuclear weapons, and became the strongest, most technologically advanced military forces in the world. In addition to out-producing the Axis, the Allies produced technological innovations; through the Tizard Mission, British contributions included radar (instrumental in winning the Battle of Britain), sonar (improving their ability to sink U-boats), and the proximity fuze; the Americans led the British-originated Manhattan Project (which eliminated the need to invade Japan). The proximity fuze, for example, was five times as effective as contact or timed fuzes and was devastating in naval use against Japanese aircraft and so effective against German ground troops that General George S. Patton said it "won the Battle of the Bulge for us."

The human and social costs of the war on the population of the USSR were immense, with combat deaths alone in the millions. Recognising the importance of their population and industrial production to the war effort, the USSR evacuated the majority of its European territory—moving 2,500 factories, 17 million people and great quantities of resources to the east. Out of German reach, the USSR produced equipment and forces critical to their victory in Europe. Over one million women served in the Soviet armed forces.

The statistics below illustrate the extent to which the Allies outproduced the Axis. Production of machine tools tripled, and thousands of ships were built in shipyards which did not exist before the war. According to William S. Knudsen, "We won because we smothered the enemy in an avalanche of production, the like of which he had never seen, nor dreamed possible."

Access to resources and to large, controlled international labour pools, and the ability to build arms in relative peace, were critical to the eventual victory of the Allies. Donald Douglas (founder of the Douglas Aircraft Company) declared, "Here's proof that free men can out-produce slaves."

Production summaries 1939–1945

Personnel, thousands

Major weapons groups

Economy
In thousands of international dollars, at 2014 prices.

Vital commerce and raw materials, tons

 Cargo and resources in metric tonnes

Production overview: service, power and type

Land forces

Air forces

Naval forces

Munitions

Commercial forces

Resources

All figures in millions of tonnes

Gross domestic product

Gross domestic product (GDP) provides insight into the relative strength of the belligerents in the run up to, and during the conflict.

Romanian, Hungarian, Bulgarian and Albanian GDP calculated by multiplying the GDP per capita of the four countries in 1938 ($1,242 for Romania, $2,655 for Hungary, $1,595 for Bulgaria and over $900 for Albania) by their estimated populations in 1938: 19,750,000 for Romania, 9,082,400 for Hungary, 6,380,000 for Bulgaria and 1,040,400 for Albania.

Table notes
 France to Axis: 1940:50% (light green), 1941–44:100% (brown)
 USSR to Allies: 1941:44% (light green), 1942–1945:100%.
 US direct support to the Allies begins with Lend Lease in March 1941, though the US made it possible for the Allies to purchase US-produced materiel from 1939
 Italy to Allies and Axis: 1938:0%, 1939–1943:100% Axis (brown), 1944-1945:100% Allies
 Japanese to Axis begins with Tripartite Pact in 1940
 The Allied and Axis totals are not the immediate sum of the table values; see the distribution rules used above.

United States World War II GDP (compared to other countries)

GDP during World War II
 Debt and higher taxes led to GDP growth percentages over 17%. This trend continued throughout the war and stopped increasing after the war ended. For the United States, government spending was used as a positive indicator of GDP growth. However the high rates of government only was beneficial for a short period of time, a trend that can be seen in most wars.
 In 1939, Britain spent 9% of its GDP on defence; this rose drastically after the start of World War II to around 40%. By the year 1945 government spending had peaked at 52% of the national GDP.
 Before joining World War II US government spending in 1941 represented 30% of GDP, or about $408 billion. In 1944 at the peak of World War II, government spending had risen to over $1.6 trillion about 79% of the GDP. During this three-year period the total GDP represented by government spending rose 394%.

US unemployment during World War II

 During World War II unemployment by 1945 had fallen to 1.9% from 14.6% in 1940. 20% of the population during the war was employed within the armed forces.
 The beginning years of World War II shows a spike in employment, but towards the end of the war decreased significantly. The employment spike was in relation to the tremendous amount of production the United States was making. Examples of high numbers of employment could have been seen in at Gulf Shipbuilding which obtained 240 employees at the beginning of 1940 and increased to 11,600 employees in 1943. Alabama Dry dock also was an exemplary business in employment that raised number from 1,000 workers to 30,000 in the most productive years of the war. Demographics of employment consisted of eight million women including African Americans and Latinas, adding to the 24 million that searched for defensive jobs outside of the war.

Price of war 
Many concerns and political influence come from the price of war. While GDP can easily increase federal expenditures, it also can influence political elections and government decision making. No matter how much percentages of GDP increase or decrease we need higher amounts of GDP in order to pay for more investments, one of those investments being more wars. To pay for these wars, taxes are held at a very high rate. For example, by the end of World War II tax rates went from 1.5% to 15%. Along with tax percentages reaching high amounts, spending on non-defense programs were cut in half during the period of World War II. Tax cuts allow one to see GDP in effect for the average American. Still, almost ten years after World War II, in 1950 and 1951 congress raised taxes close to 4% in order to pay for the Korean War. After the Korean War, in 1968 taxes again were raised 10% to pay for the Vietnam War. This caused GDP to increase 1%. Although research can support positive relationship between production and jobs with GDP, research can also show the negative relationship with tax increases and GDP.

US wartime production
Prior to the Second World War, the United States was cautious with regard to its manufacturing capabilities as the country was still recovering from the Great Depression. However, during the war, President Franklin D. Roosevelt set ambitious production goals to fulfill. The early 1940s were set to have 60,000 aircraft increasing to 125,000 in 1943. In addition, targets for the production of 120,000 tanks and 55,000 aircraft were set during the same time period. The Ford Motor Company in Michigan built one motor car (comprising 15,000 parts) on the assembly lines every 69 seconds. Ford's production contributed to America's total production of vehicles totalling three million in 1941. American production numbers caused the US employed workforce to increase massively. America's yearly production exceeded Japan's production building more planes in 1944 than Japan built in all the war years combined. As a result, half of the world's war production came from America. The government paid for this production using techniques of selling war bonds to financial institutions, rationing household items and creating more tax revenues.

One part of the US wartime manufacturing boom can be ascribed to Alcoa's second major reduction plant in Mobile, Alabama starting in 1937. At first serving mainly the Japanese market, the plant prepared thousands of tons of aluminum for the production of aeroplanes during the war. The United States quickly adjusted to the levels of production required to equip its military with the millions of war products used during World War II.

Personnel – Allied – Britain, dominions and possessions
Including all non-British subjects in British services.

Note:
 Auxiliary units include Home Guard, Reserves, Police regiments, etc.

Personnel – Axis – German Reich
This includes all German and non-German subjects serving within German Reich forces.

Note:
 Auxiliary units include Home Guard, Wehrmachtsgefolge, Reserves, Police regiments, etc.
 USSR includes Armenia 4k SS, 14k Wehr, 7k Aux; Azerbaijan 55k SS, 70k Wehr; Belarus 12k Wehr, 20k Aux; Cossack 200k Wehr; Estonia 20k SS, 50k Wehr, 7k Aux; Georgia 10k SS; 30k Wehr; Kalmyk 5k Wehr; Latvia 55k SS; 87k Wehr, 300 Air, 23k Aux; Lithuania 50k Wehr, 10 Aux; North Caucuses 4k SS; Russia 60k SS, 26k Wehr; Turkestan 16k Wehr; Ukrainian 300k Wehr; 2k Aux; Tatar/Urals 12k Wehr

Aircraft – Allied – British Empire

Within the UK, initially aircraft production was very vulnerable to enemy bombing. To expand and diversify the production base the British set up shadow factories. These brought other manufacturing companies – such as vehicle manufacturers – into aircraft production, or aircraft parts production. These inexperienced companies were set up in groups under the guidance or control of the aircraft manufacturers. New factory buildings were provided with government money.

Aircraft – Allies – France, Poland and minor powers
Production numbers until the time of the German occupation of the respective country.
Some types listed were in production before the war, those listed were still in production at the time of or after the Munich crisis.

Aircraft - Axis - All
Occupied countries produced weapons for the Axis powers. Figures are for the period of occupation only.

Propaganda posters

See also
 Allied technological cooperation during World War II
 Combined Food Board
 Combined Munitions Assignments Board
 Combined Raw Materials Board
 Combined Shipping Adjustment Board
 American armored fighting vehicle production during World War II
 British armoured fighting vehicle production during World War II
 German armored fighting vehicle production during World War II
 Soviet industry in World War II
 Soviet armored fighting vehicle production during World War II
 United States aircraft production during World War II
 Forced labour under German rule during World War II
 Technology during World War II

Notes

Citations

Table data

Personnel -Allied - British Empire

 Wayback Machine Australia 2]
 This website is currently unavailable. "Facts & Information"] Canada at War July 4, 2009
 
 
 
 
 
 
 http://idsa.in/system/files/IndiaWorldWarII.pdf India 3 idsa.in
 
 
 The Battle for Miri and Sarawak, Borneo, WW II (article) by Franz L Kessler on AuthorsDen Malay
 The Allied Merchant Navy - Their Legacy… Our Freedom
  Netherlands
  Netherlands
  Newfoundland
  New Zealand
  Nigeria
 
 South African Military History Society - Journal - The South African Corps of Marines South Africa
 Flying High: The Story of the Women's Auxiliary Air Force 1939-1945 - South African Military History Society - Journal South Africa

Personnel - Axis
 
 Volunteers, Ailsby 2004

Raw materials

 The Mineral Industry of the British Empire and Foreign Countries, Statistical Summary 1938–1944, The Imperial Institute, HMSO, 1948
 The Mineral Industry of the British Empire and Foreign Countries, Statistical Summary 1941–1947, The Imperial Institute, HMSO, 1949

Official histories

 History of the Second World War (104 volumes), Her Majesty's Stationery Office, London 1949 to 1993
 Official History of Australia in the War of 1939–1945 (22 volumes), Australian Government Printing Service, 1952 to 1977
 Official History of the Canadian Army in the Second World War, Vol I Six Years of War, Stacey, C P., Queen's Printer, Ottawa, 1955
 Official History of the Indian Armed Forces in the Second World War 1939-45 (24 volumes), Combined Inter-Services Historical Section, India & Pakistan, New Delhi, 1956-1966
 Official History of New Zealand in the Second World War 1939–45, Historical Publications Branch, Wellington, New Zealand, 1965

Bibliography

 Ailsby, Christopher, Hitler's Renegades: Foreign Nationals in the Service of the Third Reich (Photographic Histories), Potomac Books, 2004
 Barnett, Correlli, The audit of war : the illusion & reality of Britain as a great nation, Macmillan, 1986
 Barnes, C.H.; James D.N. Shorts Aircraft since 1900, London, Putnam, 1989
 Bishop, Chris, The Encyclopaedia of Weapons of World War II, Sterling Publishing, 2002
 Bowyer, Michael J.F. Aircraft for the Royal Air Force: The "Griffon" Spitfire, The Albemarle Bomber and the Shetland Flying-Boat, London, Faber & Faber, 1980
 Boyd, David, (2009) "Wartime Production by the Commonwealth during WWII" British Equipment of the Second World War
 
 Butler, Tony. British Secret Projects: Fighters and Bombers 1935–1950. Hinckley, UK: Midland Publishing, 2004
 Canada at War, "The Canadian War Industry"
 Dressel, Joachim and Manfred Griehl. Bombers of the Luftwaffe. London: DAG Publications, 1994
 Flint, Keith, Airborne Armour: Tetrarch, Locust, Hamilcar and the 6th Airborne Armoured Reconnaissance Regiment 1938-1950. Helion & Company Ltd., 2006
 Francillon, René J., Japanese Aircraft of the Pacific War, London, Putnam, 1970
 Gregg, W.A ed., Canada’s Fighting Vehicles Europe 1943-1945, Canadian Military Historical Society, 1980
 Green, William. War Planes of The Second World War:Volume Seven - Bombers and Reconnaissance Aircraft. London: Macdonald, 1967
 Harrison, Mark, "The Economics of World War II: Six Great Powers in International Comparison", Cambridge University Press, 1998  (Author's overview)
 Herman, Arthur. Freedom's Forge: How American Business Produced Victory in World War II, Random House, New York, 2012
 The Illustrated Encyclopedia of Aircraft (Part Work 1982–1985). London: Orbis Publishing, 1985
 Jackson, A.J., De Havilland Aircraft since 1909 (Third ed.), London, Putnam, 1987
 Jane's Fighting Aircraft of World War II, London, Studio Editions Ltd, 1989
 "Les luxembourgeois de la Brigade Piron". (in French) Armee.lu. Retrieved 29 June 2013
 Long, Jason, Lend Lease as a Function of the Soviet war Economy, sturmvogel.orbat.com, Retrieved June 12, 2014
 Mason, Francis K. The British Bomber since 1914, London: Putnam Aeronautical Books, 1994
 Milward, Alan S., War, economy, and society, 1939-1945, University of California Press, 1979
 Morgan, Eric B. "Albemarle" in Twentyfirst Profile, Volume 1, No. 11. New Milton, Hants, UK: 21st Profile Ltd.
 Munoz, A.J., For Croatia and Christ: The Croatian Army in World War II 1941–1945, Axis Europa Books, NY, 1996
 Mondey, David. The Concise Guide to Axis Aircraft of World War II. New York: Bounty Books, 1996
 Ness, Leland, Jane's World War II Tanks and Fighting Vehicles, The Complete Guide, Harper Collins, 2002
 Otway, Lieutenant-Colonel T.B.H. The Second World War 1939-1945 Army: Airborne Forces. London: Imperial War Museum, 1990
 Overy, Richard, Why the Allies Won (Paperback), W. W. Norton & Company, 1997
 Scientia Militaria, South African Journal of Military Studies
 Smith, J.R. and Anthony L. Kay. German Aircraft of the Second World War. London: Putnam and Company Ltd.,
 Swanborough, Gordon. British Aircraft at War, 1939-1945. East Sussex, UK: HPC Publishing, 1997
 Tapper, Oliver. Armstrong Whitworth Aircraft since 1913. London: Putnam, 1988
 Tomasevich, Jozo, War and Revolution in Yugoslavia, 1941–1945: Occupation and Collaboration 2. San Francisco: Stanford University Press, 2001
 Veterans Affairs Canada, "Canadian Production of War Materials"
 Wilson, Stewart, Aircraft of WWII, 1998
 Wrynn, V. Dennis. Forge of Freedom: American Aircraft Production in World War II, Motorbooks International, Osceola, WI, 1995
 Zuljan, Ralph, "Allied and Axis GDP"  Articles On War OnWar.com (2003)

External links

 Allies and Lend-Lease Museum, Russia
 Australia War Memorial official war history online archive
 Canada at War
 National War Museum, United States
 New Zealand in the Second World War, official war history online
 South Africa Journal of Military Studies

Military equipment of World War II
Economic history of World War II
Military logistics of World War II